Heptapleurum arboricola (syn. Schefflera arboricola) is a flowering plant in the family Araliaceae, native to Taiwan and Hainan Province, China. Its common name is dwarf umbrella tree, as it resembles a smaller version of the umbrella tree, Heptapleurum actinophyllum.

Description
 
It is an evergreen shrub growing to 8–9 m tall, free-standing, or clinging to the trunks of other trees as an epiphyte. The leaves are palmately compound, with 7–9 leaflets, the leaflets 9–20 cm long and 4–10 cm broad (though often smaller in cultivation) with a wedge-shaped base, entire margin, and an obtuse or acute apex, sometimes emarginate. The leaves are leathery in texture, shiny green, glabrous on the upper surface and somewhat lighter and matte on the underside. Young plants have smaller leaves and fewer leaflets. Each leaflet has a central rib that divides it into two halves, with between four and six ribs clearly visible up to the third order. The stipules merge with the petiole, the length of which is 12-15 cm.

Flowers
Appearing from midsummer to early autumn, the flowers are produced in a 20 cm panicle of small umbels, each umbel 7–10 mm in diameter with 5–10 flowers. The flowers are hermaphroditic, having a colour ranging from yellow to green and a double perianth radial symmetry. They are composed of an entire annular calyx, five almost fully developed sepals, a corolla with five petals 2.5 mm long, with five stamens and five or six carpels that enclose the ovary. The style is not recognizable and the stigma is established.

Fruits
The fruits have an almost spherical oval drupe, with a diameter of about 5 mm. The endocarp contains five seeds. The fruits ripen from late summer to early winter.  They begin as orange glandular points.  At maturity, they become red-violet. The fruits are inedible to humans, but may be consumed (and spread elsewhere) by various birds, parrots or other animals.

Distribution
This species is indigenous to China, but has widely naturalized elsewhere. It is now found in the northern, tropical regions of Australia; in areas of Queensland, it has been noted to significantly compete with native species. It has also been introduced to the Ryukyu Islands, Hawaii, Florida, Bermuda, and Jamaica.

Cultivation and uses
Heptapleurum arboricola is commonly grown as a houseplant, popular for its tolerance of neglect and poor growing conditions. It is also grown as a landscape (garden) plant in milder climates where frosts are not severe. Numerous cultivars have been selected for variations in leaf colour and pattern, often variegated with creamy-white to yellow edges or centres, and dwarf forms. The cultivar 'Gold Capella' has gained the Royal Horticultural Society's Award of Garden Merit.

Poisoning
There is no evidence that this species is responsible for poisonings. It is widely used in animal enclosures in zoos and pet enclosures.

Care
The plant prefers higher light if possible, but can adapt to a wide variety of light levels. As a tropical plant it likes moisture (and humidity), but avoid letting the plant sit in water after you water it.  It likes to be moist but not wet so just let the soil dry out between waterings.

Aerial roots
Under the right conditions, this plant will produce aerial roots that, when they reach the ground, will convert to fully functional roots. They give the plant an unusual and interesting appearance. Three conditions must be maintained for the plant to produce them: a high growth rate, insufficient trunk roots (the plant is root bound or these roots are pruned) and constant, very high humidity.

Photo gallery

References

External links
Fukubonsai, information about Heptapleurum arboricola as indoor bonsai.

arboricola
Flora of Hainan
Flora of Taiwan
House plants
Plants used in traditional Chinese medicine
Plants used in bonsai
Taxa named by Bunzō Hayata
Plants described in 1916